PRIA is a four-letter acronym or abbreviation, and may refer to:

 International Conference on Pattern Recognition and Image Analysis, a biennial scientific international conference
Pre-Roman Iron Age, a  Northern European archaeological period
 Proceedings of the Royal Irish Academy, an Irish journal
 Public Relations Institute of Australia, an Australian association of communication professionals
The Pilot Record Improvement Act, a United States law enhancing recordkeeping of pilots by the Federal Aviation Administration
Pria may refer to:
 Pría,  a municipality within the province and autonomous community of Asturias, in northern Spain
 Pria (Crasna), a tributary of the Crasna in Sălaj County, Romania
 Pria, a tributary of the Homorod in Hunedoara County, Romania
 Pria (beetle), an insect genus in the family Nitidulidae (the sap beetles)
 Priya (given name), a girl's name common in India meaning "beloved"
 "Pria," episode of The Orville